Tadanobu Usami (31 October 1925 – 10 November 2011) was a Japanese trade union leader.

Born in Tokyo, Usami was educated at the Takachiho College of Economics, and in 1946 he began working at the Fuji Cotton Spinning Company.   Later in the year, he moved to work full-time for the new Japan Federation of Textile Workers' Unions.  He served on the union's Central Executive Committee from 1947, became Assistant General Secretary in 1955, General Secretary in 1961, and President in 1971.

In 1972, Usami additionally became vice president of the Japanese Confederation of Labour, serving as president from 1980.  The same year, he was elected as president of the ICFTU Asia and Pacific Regional Organisation.

Usami died of pneumonia in November 2011.

References

1925 births
2011 deaths
Japanese trade union leaders
People from Tokyo